This list of tallest buildings in Adelaide ranks the tallest buildings in Adelaide, South Australia, by height.  Frome Central Tower 1 (at 11-27 Frome Street) reached  on 1 November 2019, becoming the city's tallest building. From its construction in 1988 until late 2019, the tallest building in Adelaide was the 31-storey Westpac House, which rises .

Height restrictions, enforced since the 1990s, have limited the number of high-rise buildings constructed in the city, although they have been eased in recent times.

Tallest buildings
This is a list of the 50 tallest buildings in Adelaide.  Heights are measured to the structural height, which includes architectural elements, but not communications spires or antennas.

Heights are listed to the roof of the building only.

NB -  Pinnacle (top of spire or antenna) heights not listed.

Tallest buildings proposed, approved and under construction
This is a list of the tallest buildings in Adelaide currently proposed, approved and under construction.

Timeline of tallest buildings 
The following table is a timeline of the tallest buildings in Adelaide (at least 50 metres):

See also 

List of tallest buildings in Australia
List of tallest buildings in Oceania

Notes

References

 Skyscraper Center (Detailed information on specific buildings)
 Emporis.com (General database of skyscrapers)
 Sensational-Adelaide (Renders and details of buildings)

Buildings and structures in Adelaide
 
Adelaide
Adelaide-related lists